Prymnetes is an extinct genus of prehistoric bony fish that lived during the Late Cretaceous epoch.

See also

 Prehistoric fish
 List of prehistoric bony fish

References

External links
 

Ichthyodectiformes
Late Cretaceous fish